Dorsifulcrum is a genus of moths in the family Geometridae erected by Claude Herbulot in 1979.

Species
Dorsifulcrum acutum Herbulot, 1979
Dorsifulcrum albescens Herbulot, 1979
Dorsifulcrum bicolor Herbulot, 1979
Dorsifulcrum canui Herbulot, 1998
Dorsifulcrum cephalotes (Walker, 1869)
Dorsifulcrum excavatum Herbulot, 1979
Dorsifulcrum fuscum Herbulot, 1979
Dorsifulcrum latum Herbulot, 1979
Dorsifulcrum meloui Herbulot, 1979
Dorsifulcrum mus Herbulot, 1979
Dorsifulcrum pinheyi Herbulot, 1979
Dorsifulcrum reductum Herbulot, 1979
Dorsifulcrum reflexum Herbulot, 1979
Dorsifulcrum rotundum Herbulot, 1979
Dorsifulcrum xeron Herbulot, 1979

References

External links

Ennominae
Geometridae genera
Moths described in 1979
Taxa named by Claude Herbulot